Theresienstadt was a Nazi concentration camp in German-occupied Czechoslovakia.

Theresienstadt may also refer to:
 Terezín or Theresienstadt, a former military fortress in the Ústí nad Labem Region of the Czech Republic
 Theresienstadt family camp, a section of Auschwitz II-Birkenau where some prisoners deported from Theresienstadt to Auschwitz were held
 Theresienstadt Small Fortress (1940–1945), a former prison of the Habsburg empire and later the Gestapo
 Theresienstadt (1944 film), a Nazi propaganda film about the Theresienstadt camp
 Terezín - Theresienstadt (Anne Sofie von Otter album), a classical music album
 Terézváros or Theriesenstadt, a district of Budapest